Valgrind may refer to:
Valgrind, the main entrance to Valhalla in Norse mythology
Valgrind, a programming tool named after this mythical gate

See also 
 Valle Grande (disambiguation)